The 2016 Trofeo de España TCR is the first season of the TCR Spanish Series. The championship will run as the first class of the Campeonato de España de Resistencia.

Teams and drivers
Michelin is the official tyre supplier.

Calendar and results
The 2016 schedule was announced on 7 January 2016, with one out of five events was scheduled to be held outside Spain, at Lédenon. It was replaced on 12 April 2016 by a round at Navarra. The race format is divided into Endurance and Sprint races: the first one contemplates a two-hour + 1 lap long race, the second one is formed by two 48-minute + 1 lap long races.

Championship standings

Scoring system

Drivers' championship

† – Drivers did not finish the race, but were classified as they completed over 75% of the race distance.

References

External links
 

Trofeo de Espana TCR
Espana TCR